Aly Male (born 15 November 1970) is a Senegalese footballer. He played in 30 matches for the Senegal national football team from 1992 to 1997. He was also named in Senegal's squad for the 1992 African Cup of Nations tournament.

References

External links
 

1970 births
Living people
Senegalese footballers
Senegal international footballers
1992 African Cup of Nations players
1994 African Cup of Nations players
Place of birth missing (living people)
Association football midfielders
Footballers from Dakar